Daniel Juárez may refer to:

 Daniel Juárez (footballer, born 1975), Argentine midfielder
 Daniel Juárez (footballer, born 2001), Argentine midfielder
 Daniel Juárez (cyclist), Argentine cyclist